Norðleoda laga is a set of laws apparently pertaining to the Anglo-Saxon kingdom of Northumbria. Mention of a Northumbrian king suggests that the text originates before the mid-tenth century, when Northumbria ceased to be an independent kingdom. The text comprises a list of the wergelds payable on the killing of people of different social statuses, with the following values:

Editions and translations
 Liebermann, F. (ed.), Die Gesetze der Angelsachsen, 3 vols (Halle a. S.: Niemeyer, 1903–16), I 458–60.
 Monk, Chris (ed. and trans.), Norðleoda Laga (‘Laws of the Northumbrians’), Textus Roffensis, ff. 93v-94r (Rochester: Rochester Cathedral Research Guild, 2018)

References

Anglo-Saxon law